Khazbulat Bogdanovich Khamkhoyev (born 16 November 1993) is a Russian football goalkeeper who plays for FC Ufa.

Club career
He made his debut in the Russian Second Division for FC Angusht Nazran on 16 July 2012 in a game against FC Taganrog. He made his Russian Football National League debut for Angusht on 7 July 2013 in a game against FC Neftekhimik Nizhnekamsk.

References

External links
 
 
 

1993 births
People from Malgobek
21st-century Russian people
Living people
Russian footballers
Association football goalkeepers
FC Angusht Nazran players
FC Mashuk-KMV Pyatigorsk players
FC Dynamo Makhachkala players
FC Ufa players
Russian First League players
Russian Second League players